The governor of Delaware (president of Delaware from 1776 to 1792) is the head of government of Delaware and the commander-in-chief of the state's military forces. The governor has a duty to enforce state laws, and the power to either approve or veto bills passed by the Delaware Legislature, to convene the legislature, and to grant pardons, except in cases of impeachment, and only with the recommendation of the Board of Pardons.

There have been 71 people who have served as governor, over 74 distinct terms. Three (Joseph Haslet, Charles Polk Jr. and Elbert N. Carvel) served non-consecutive terms. Additionally, Henry Molleston was elected, but died before he could take office. Only four governors have been elected to two consecutive terms, with the longest-serving being Ruth Ann Minner, who was elected twice after succeeding to the office, serving a total of just over eight years. The shortest term is that of Dale E. Wolf, who served 18 days following his predecessor's resignation; David P. Buckson served 19 days under similar circumstances. The current governor is Democrat John Carney, who took office on January 17, 2017.

Governors
Before 1776, Delaware was a colony of the Kingdom of Great Britain, administered by colonial governors in Pennsylvania as the "Lower Counties on Delaware".

In 1776, soon after Delaware and the other Thirteen Colonies declared independence from Britain, the state adopted its first state constitution. It created the office of President of Delaware, a chief executive to be chosen by the legislature to serve a term of three years.

The office of President was renamed Governor by the constitution of 1792, which set the commencement date of the term to the third Tuesday in the January following an election, and limited governors to serving only three out of any six years. The term was lengthened to four years by the 1831 constitution, but governors were limited to a single term. The current constitution of 1897 allows governors to serve two terms.

The 1776 constitution stated that if the presidency were vacant, the speaker of the legislative council would be a vice-president. The 1792 constitution has the speaker of the senate exercising the office when it is vacant, and the 1897 constitution created the office of lieutenant governor, upon whom the office devolves in case of vacancy. The offices of governor and lieutenant governor are elected at the same time but not on the same ticket.

See also
 Delaware gubernatorial elections
 Gubernatorial lines of succession in the United States#Delaware

Notes

References
General

Constitutions

 
 Constitution of the State of Delaware (1831)
 Constitution of the State of Delaware (1792)
 

Specific

External links

Office of the Governor of Delaware
 Delaware Hall of Governors

Delaware
Governors